Volodymyr Viktorovych Chulanov ( born 12 October 1985) is a Ukrainian retired football player.

Career
He started his career with Desna Chernihiv and on 6 August 2005 he made his debut in the season 2005-06 in Ukrainian First League. With the club of Chernihiv he played until 2009, then in 2010 he moved to Sevastopol and Helios Kharkiv, where he played 8 and 3 matches. In 2011 he returned to Desna Chernihiv until 2016 where he played 91 games and scored 2 goals.

Outside of professional football
In 12 March 2022 together with Artem Padun, Valentyn Krukovets, Oleksandr Babor, they organized a charity tournamentin Chernihiv Stadium in Chernihiv to organize a donation to reconstruct the house of the Volodymyr Matsuta which was destroyed by the russian troops, during the Siege of Chernihiv.

References

External links 
 Volodymyr Chulanov allplayers.in.ua
 Volodymyr Chulanov footballfacts.ru
 Volodymyr Chulanov soccerway.com
 

1985 births
Living people
Footballers from Chernihiv
Ukrainian footballers
FC Desna Chernihiv players
FC Sevastopol players
FC Helios Kharkiv players
FC Avanhard Koriukivka players
SDYuShOR Desna players
Ukrainian First League players
Ukrainian Second League players
Ukrainian Amateur Football Championship players
Association football defenders